Home Made (is an Israeli short film directed and written by Shira Meishar, and produced by Lihi Sabag. The film has been screened at Durban International Film Festival, Sonoma International Film Festival and more.

Plot
A woman who is supposed to be going home to her partner to celebrate her 50th birthday prepares to leave the restaurant where she works. But in the end she stays a little longer and spends the evening with two strangers. A film about the alternative life that resides in each of us.

Cast

Reception 

The film won for the Best Script at the Tel Aviv International Student Film Festival. It was nominated at the Palm Springs International Film Festival and semi-finalists in the 44th Student Academy Awards. Evgenia Dodina won a prize for acting in the film at the Actors Festival.

References

External links
 

Israeli short films